The By-paths of Bible Knowledge series was a collection of books connected with Bible study. History, geography, archaeology, and other topics related to the Bible were presented by various experts. The series was published in London from 1883 by the Religious Tract Society.

Titles in the series
 by the Rev. James King; 
 by Margaret Elise Harkness
 by A. H. Sayce; 
 by the Rev. James King
 by E. A. Wallis Budge
 by Selah Merrill; 
 by Sir J. W. Dawson
 by A. H. Sayce
 by E. A. Wallis Budge
 by Sir J. Risdon Bennett; 
 by William H. Groser
 by H. Chichester Hart
 by A. H. Sayce
 by A. H. Sayce
 by J. T. Wood
 by A. H. Drysdale
 by A. H. Sayce, with illustrations from photographs by Flinders Petrie
 by the Rev. H. G. Tomkins
 by A. H. Sayce
 by Joseph Edkins
 by G. C. Williamson
 by the Rev. C. G. K. Gillespie
 by William Knight
 by A. H. Sayce;

References

External links

Book series introduced in 1883
Series of non-fiction books
British non-fiction books
Biblical studies
Series of books